The 2018–19 Bundesliga was the 74th season of the Bundesliga, Germany's premier field hockey league. It began on 1 September 2018 and it concluded with the championship final on 19 May 2019 in Krefeld.

Club an der Alster were the defending champions.

Teams

A total of 12 teams participated in the 2018–2019 edition of the Bundesliga. The promoted teams were Bremer HC and Zehlendorfer Wespen, who replaced Großflottbeker THGC and Club Raffelberg.

Number of teams by state

Results

Regular season

Results

Play–offs

Semi-finals

Final

References

External links
Official website

Bundesliga
Feldhockey-Bundesliga 2018-19
Feldhockey-Bundesliga 2018-19